South West was a combined constituency region of the European Parliament, comprising the South West of England and Gibraltar.  Seven, later six, Members of the European Parliament using closed party-list proportional representation allocated using the D'Hondt method of distribution were elected. The constituency was abolished when Britain left the European Union on 31 January 2020.

Boundaries
The constituency consisted of the South West England region of the United Kingdom, comprising the ceremonial counties of Bristol, Cornwall, Devon, Dorset, Gloucestershire, Somerset and Wiltshire. It also included the British overseas territory of Gibraltar from 2004.

History
The constituency was formed as a result of the European Parliamentary Elections Act 1999, replacing a number of single-member constituencies. These were Bristol, Cornwall and West Plymouth, Devon and East Plymouth, Dorset and East Devon, Somerset and North Devon, Wiltshire North and Bath, and parts of Cotswolds.

Before the 2004 election, it was expanded to include Gibraltar. This was the result of a 1999 European Court of Human Rights case, which argued that Gibraltar should be entitled to vote in European elections. Spain took a complaint about non-EU Commonwealth citizens resident in Gibraltar participating in European elections to the European Court of Justice, but their case was unsuccessful.

The number of seats was reduced from seven to six for the 2009 election.

Returned members

Election results

See also: 2004 European Parliament election in Gibraltar and 2009 European Parliament election in Gibraltar

Elected candidates are shown in bold.  Brackets indicate the order in which candidates were elected and number of votes per seat won in their respective columns.

Campaign for a dedicated Euro-constituency and MEP for Cornwall
The Cornish nationalist party Mebyon Kernow campaigned for a separate European Parliament constituency for Cornwall.  Until 1994 Cornwall was represented by the much smaller Cornwall and Plymouth constituency.

See also
 2014 European Parliament election in Gibraltar

References

European Parliament constituencies in England (1999–2020)
Politics of Cornwall
Politics of South West England
Gibraltar and the European Union
1999 establishments in England
1999 establishments in Gibraltar
Constituencies established in 1999
Constituencies disestablished in 2020